The Keys Ranch is the prime example of early settlement in the Joshua Tree National Park area. Bill Keys was the area's leading character, and his ranch is a symbol of the resourcefulness of early settlers. The ranch is an extensive complex of small frame buildings built between 1910 and Keys' death in 1964. Keys pursued both ranching and mining to make a living in the desert.

William F. Keys was born at Palisade, Nebraska, in 1879. After working as a ranch hand and smelter worker, he was a deputy sheriff in Mohave County, Arizona. During a time in Death Valley, he befriended Death Valley Scotty, becoming involved in a swindle that resulted in the so-called "Battle of Wingate Pass". He arrived in the Twentynine Palms, California area in 1910. In the area that became Joshua Tree National Park, he became acquainted with local outlaw and cattle rustler Jim McHaney, taking care of him in declining health. Keys eventually took over McHaney's properties after McHaney's death, gradually expanding what became the Desert Queen, its name borrowed from the nearby Desert Queen Mine.

Keys married Francis M. Lawton in 1918, and they had seven children together, three of whom died and were buried at the ranch. During a dispute over the Wall Street Mill, Keys shot and killed Worth Bagley.  Keys was convicted of murder and went to San Quentin Prison, where Keys educated himself in the library.  Keys was paroled in 1950 and was pardoned in 1956 through the efforts of Erle Stanley Gardner, author of the Perry Mason novels.

Mining equipment at the ranch includes an arrastra and a stamp mill for ore processing. Other buildings include an adobe barn, a schoolhouse, a tack shed, machine shed, cemetery and a variety of houses and cabins.

Park rangers provide guided walking tours of the ranch from October through May.  Tours are limited in size and should be booked in advance.

Gallery

See also
Cow Camp, Jim McHaney's outlaw camp
Wall Street Mill
Barker Dam

References

External links

Keys Ranch Guided Walking Tour - official site at Joshua Tree National Park
Keys Ranch: Where Time Stood Still - National Park Service historic lesson article

Desert USA article about Keys Desert Queen Ranch
Digital Desert 360 immersive image of the Desert Queen Ranch

National Register of Historic Places in Joshua Tree National Park
Historic house museums in California
Museums in San Bernardino County, California
National Register of Historic Places in San Bernardino County, California
Ranches on the National Register of Historic Places in California
Historic American Buildings Survey in California
Historic American Engineering Record in California
Historic districts on the National Register of Historic Places in California
1894 establishments in California